The  is a railway line of the Japanese private railway operator Seibu Railway. It originates at Ikebukuro Station, a large railway junction in north-western Tokyo, extending to northwest suburbs as far as Tokorozawa, Saitama, and nominally terminates at Agano Station.

The Seibu Chichibu Line from Agano to Seibu-Chichibu Station is an extension. The operation is largely divided into two sections: from Ikebukuro to Hannō Station and from Hannō to Seibu-Chichibu Station.

The section from Hannō to Seibu-Chichibu is single track, but every station except for Higashi-Hanno has passing loops, and trains may pass each other at any stop. There is also a passing loop inside a tunnel where the signal controls bi-directional operation. The rest of all the lines is double track with  track gauge.

Branch lines
The Ikebukuro Line has three branches with through operation, apart from the Seibu Chichibu Line.
Toshima Line
 length, with Local trains through from Ikebukuro.
Seibu Yūrakuchō Line
The bypass to Tokyo Metro Yūrakuchō Line/Tokyo Metro Fukutoshin Line, with Semi Expresses and Rapids from Hannō to Shin-Kiba Station/Motomachi-Chukagai Station, with Locals.
Seibu Sayama Line
Through trains are operated daily during off-peak hours. Special Limited Express "Dome" services are occasionally operated for baseball games of the Saitama Seibu Lions.

Line data 
Tracks:
 4-track: Nerima to Shakujii-kōen
 2-track: Ikebukuro to Nerima, Shakujii-kōen to Hannō, Kita-Hannō rail yard to Musashigaoka Rail yard
 1-track: the remainder

Service pattern
Abbreviations here are for the table below, not formally used.
 
Stops at all stations. The longest operations are Ikebukuro to Hannō, through to Seibu Kyūjō-mae on Sayama Line, through to Toshimaen on Toshima Line. Also through from Tokyo Metro Yūrakuchō Line to Kotesashi and Hannō. Major sections of service are from: Ikebukuro to Toshima-en and Hōya; from Shin-Kiba on Tokyo Metro Yūrakuchō Line to Hōya, Kiyose and Kotesashi and from Motomachi-Chūkagai on the Minatomirai Line to Shakujii-kōen, Hōya, and Hannō.
  (SE)
Operated all day. Longest from Ikebukuro to Hannō and Seibu Kyūjō-mae. Through from Yūrakuchō Line to Hannō.
  (CSE)
Morning hours only, one direction up from Kotesashi to Ikebukuro.
  (Ra)
Morning and evening hours to/from Ikebukuro, daytime through to Yūrakuchō Line. Longest to Hannō (seasonally one service a day to Seibu-Chichibu) and Seibu Kyūjō-mae.
  (CE)
Morning hours only, one direction up from Hannō to Ikebukuro.
  (Ex)
All day operation, from Ikebukuro to Hannō.
  (RE)
Morning rush hour from Hannō to Ikebukuro, daytime to and from Hannō/Kotesashi to Motomachi-Chūkagai via the Tokyo Metro Fukutoshin Line, Tokyu Toyoko Line and Minatomirai Lines.
  (ST) 
  (LE)

Stations

Local services are not shown, as they stop at all stations.
O: stop; |: pass; ↑: pass (services run in one direction, towards Ikebukuro only); *: limited stop; ↓: boarding only towards Ikebukuro, alighting only towards Tokorozawa (weekdays)

Notes:

Rolling stock
 Seibu 001 series (Limited express services)
 Seibu 2000 series
 Seibu 4000 series
 Seibu 6000 series
 Seibu 9000 series 
 Seibu 10000 series (Limited express services, until 13 March 2020)
 Seibu 20000 series
 Seibu 30000 series
 Seibu 40000 series (Since 2017)
 Tokyo Metro 10000 series
 Tokyo Metro 17000 series
 Tokyu 5000 series
 Tokyu 5050 series
 Tokyu 5050-4000 series
 Yokohama Minatomirai Railway Y500 series

History 
In 1922, electrification began in three stages from Ikebukuro, until reaching Hannō in 1925. In the late 1920s, a second track was added from Ikebukuro to Hōya Station, and in 1929 the line was extended to Agano Station, the present nominal end. On 25 March 1952, the line was renamed to the Ikebukuro line, and throughout the 1950s and 1960s, the 2-track section was extended in stages until reaching Kasanui yard in 1969.

In 1969, the Seibu Chichibu Line was completed to Seibu-Chichibu Station to begin through operation from Ikebukuro; in 1989, bypass tracks were laid to the Chichibu Railway Main Line; and in 1998, through service via Seibu Yurakucho Line of Seibu to the Tokyo Metro's Yurakucho Line began to Shinkiba Station.

In 2001, a second track of 350 m was built to complete the double-track section from Ikebukuro to Hannō. At the same time, the elevated 4-track section from Nerima-Takanodai to Nakamurabashi opened. This elevated 4-track section was extended to Nerima in 2003.

Station numbering was introduced on all Seibu Railway lines during fiscal 2012, with Seibu Ikebukuro Line stations numbered prefixed with the letters "SI".

From 10 September 2012, 10-car 5050-4000 series sets entered revenue service on the Seibu Ikebukuro Line and Seibu Yurakucho Line, with inter-running through to the Tokyo Metro Fukutoshin Line.

See also
 List of railway lines in Japan

References

External links

 Route diagram 

 
Ikebukuro Line
Railway lines in Tokyo
Rail transport in Saitama Prefecture
1067 mm gauge railways in Japan
1500 V DC railway electrification